Canada's Worst Driver 8 was the eighth season of the Canadian reality TV show Canada's Worst Driver, which aired on the Discovery Channel. As with previous years, eight people, nominated by their family or friends, enter the Driver Rehabilitation Centre to improve their driving skills. The focus of this season was on Big City Driving. This year, the Driver Rehabilitation Centre is located at the Dunnville Airport in Dunnville, Ontario for the third straight season (despite using the series logo first commissioned in Canada's Worst Driver 6, the logo from Seasons 1-5 was used in the opening and all commercial outros). The initial drive started in Niagara Falls, Ontario and the final road test occurred in Hamilton, Ontario.

Experts
Three experts return from the seventh season, though Peter Mellor, head instructor for the past three seasons, is not among them.
 Cam Woolley is the show's longest-serving expert, having been present in every season except the first and has seen the habits of Canadian drivers change drastically since 2000, with the most common offense having changed from DUI to distracted driving. He is the traffic expert on CP24 in Toronto and had a 25-year career as a traffic sergeant with the Ontario Provincial Police.
 Philippe Létourneau is a veteran high-speed driving instructor who counts BMW and Ferrari among his clients. Since joining the show in the third season, the average car has gained considerably in speed and acceleration, with the high-speed emphasis of this season making his job a particularly important one.
 Shyamala Kiru returns for her second season as the resident psychotherapist and relationship expert.
 Tim Danter is the new head driving instructor this season who is with DriveWise.

Contestants
 Robert Cárdenas, 26, from Toronto, Ontario (originally from Cuba), is a college student originally who owns a car but has no real desire to drive it; he prefers public transit because he is an overly cautious and slow driver who cannot handle highway speeds or large numbers of other vehicles and pedestrians. He is considering selling his car if he cannot improve his driving skills. He was nominated by his friend, Socrates. He drives a grey Hyundai Sonata and drove a blue Nissan Altima to the rehab centre.
 Margherita Donato, 31, from Edmonton, Alberta, is a bar owner more focused on her appearance than her driving and has caused $250,000 in damage by running into an RV. Margherita is just one ticket away from having her license suspended. Margherita has also admitted to bribing her driving examiner $80 to pass her test. She was nominated by her best friend and business partner, Cheryl Schultz, who now does all the driving for their business, Sneaky Pete's Bar and Grill. She drives a green Suzuki Aerio and drove a green Ford Focus to the rehab centre.
 Azim Kanji, 28, from Edmonton, Alberta, failed his learners' test six times before finally getting his license, but is unable to reverse or park his car and had a $2,300 speeding ticket, which led to him stressing so much, he started losing his hair. He was nominated by his buddy, Ray. He drives a red Volkswagen Corrado and drove a red Pontiac G5 to the rehab centre.
 Klyne Postnikoff, 18 and licensed for two years, from Kelowna, British Columbia, is a short order cook who has written off two cars, including his mother's, within two weeks of having his license, had his license suspended and caused ten accidents and continues to text while driving, continues to speed and believes he is invincible. Klyne was nominated by his mother, Maureen, who laughs at his crashes on the show and continues to pick up the tab for his accidents and insurance. He drives a red Dodge Durango 4x4 and drove a blue GMC Sierra to the rehab centre.
 Dallas Sam, 26, from Vancouver, British Columbia, is a university student with a tough-girl appearance, but is really a nervous wreck behind the wheel of a car. Her sister, Gene, thinks she may have gotten her license based on looks rather than driving skills. She drives a tan GMC Jimmy and drove an orange Chevrolet Cobalt to the rehab centre.
 Kevin Simmons, 25, from McBride, British Columbia (now lives in Burnaby, British Columbia), is a grocery store worker born with no vision in his right eye and needs a new corrective lens for his left eye annually. Kevin has had five accidents so far (two of them serious). He was nominated by his boyfriend, Lenny Stone, who really wants Kevin to stop driving altogether. He drives a white Ford LTD Crown Victoria and drove a gray Dodge Grand Caravan to the rehab centre.
 Flora Wang, 39, from Edmonton, Alberta (originally from China), is a home care worker who immigrated to Canada in 2006 and only had ten hours of training before getting her license and is very nervous behind the wheel, often freezing in the middle of traffic when she gets scared as English is not her first language. She relies on her husband, Frank, for driving advice, although Frank is frequently wrong. Flora almost rolled the show's 2012 Mustang GT at 140 km/h during the Eye of the Needle because she didn't understand the need to take her foot off the accelerator. She drives a red Dodge Grand Caravan and drove a blue Dodge Grand Caravan to the rehab centre.
She got her license after persistent nagging from her family and, once she got it, told her husband of ten years, Stephane, not to talk to her about driving again. She drives a white Nissan Pathfinder and drove a silver Chevrolet Equinox to the rehab centre.

Synopsis

 (CWD) The contestants became Canada's Worst Driver.
 (OUT) The contestant graduated.
 (IN) The contestant was shortlisted for graduation.

Episode 0: Canada's Worst Driver: U Asked!
Original airdate: October 28, 2012
Host Andrew Younghusband answers the most frequently asked questions from fans about the show. Those questions are in regard to him and his role, the experts, the nominees, the nominators, the vehicles used and the collective interactions with each other and with the crew (most specifically with what are assumed the several damaged cameras). Andrew also passes along a message from several fans to perhaps the most beloved of the 56 nominees to date-- Aaron Cheshire, whose reasons for being at the Drivers' Rehabilitation Centre in the previous season outlined what all the other 55 nominees should have taken to heart-- and answers the most frequently asked question of all: in his opinion, who indeed is Canada's Worst Driver?

Episode 1: Here They Come...
Original airdate: October 29, 2012
The Drive to Rehab: This season, the journey to the Driver Rehabilitation Centre begins from the parking lot of the old Niagara Falls Memorial Arena in Niagara Falls. The contestants depart in the following order: Flora, Robert, Dallas, Kevin, Diane, Azim, Margherita and Klyne. For once, none of the drivers are stopped by the police or the show's crew, though most do make a large number of moving violations on the way to rehab and the contestants arrive in the following order: Robert (who never signaled once and ran a red light, not to mention going 81 km/h), Diane (despite her extreme stress), Azim (who missed an early turn and went completely off-course for a while), Klyne (who not only repeatedly snapped and yelled at Maureen and refused to let her view the directions, but drove while texting and sped up to 135 km/h in an 80 km/h zone, an incident which would almost certainly have seen his drive stopped by the crew if not for the fact that he was only a short distance away from rehab anyway, resulting in Andrew chewing him out after he arrives and telling him that while he may have some driving skills, he most certainly doesn't have the brains to use them), Dallas (who was so scared of driving, she had to pull over and cry), Margherita (who finished with 17 moving violations), Kevin (who drove like a rookie) and Flora (despite being the first to leave for rehab).
First to Arrive: Robert was the second to leave, but the first to arrive.
Last to Arrive: Flora was the last.
Fastest to Arrive: Klyne was the fastest to arrive, going 135 km/h in an 80 km/h zone.
Slowest to Arrive: Kevin was the slowest to arrive. During his drive, he nearly collided with another car while merging onto a highway. He arrived at 2:50.
Mustang Challenge: Basic Assessment: For their first challenge, drivers are put through a short evaluation test to determine their levels of driving skill-- U-turning a Ford Mustang GT in an enclosed space made of concrete blocks, followed by a short reverse course made up of wheel rims and then a slalom between foam people at 50 km/h. Margherita is first-up and even before she starts, Andrew objects to her wearing high-heeled shoes while driving. She scratches the Mustang's paint job in the initial section, then her inability to comprehend where her wheels are means she can't go more than a few feet of the reverse section without hitting something and her growing frustrations causes her to cause more and more damage to the course (and car) as she progresses. Finally, she goes too slow on the slalom and doesn't even check her speedometer, hitting two of the five foam people. Azim's run goes much the same as Margherita's, as he gets stressed out after he scratches the car in the initial section, which leads to a poor performance in the reverse section (further increasing his stress) and ultimately results in him driving with just one hand on the wheel and going over-speed in the slalom, causing him to spin out. Kevin becomes the first driver to cause a serious dent in the Mustang's body during the opening U-turn, then knocks over more rims than either of the two previous drivers and then ends up going less than half the required speed in the slalom, yet still hits four of the five foam people. Dallas relies almost exclusively on Gene's advice when getting through the initial U-turn, but ultimately completes it without a single scratch or hit. She copes a little better in the reversing section than any of the previous drivers, though she still knocks down several wheel rims; it's a similar story in the slalom, where she has the best run yet, but still knocks down a foam person. Andrew identifies her problem as being a lack of confidence in her own abilities, something Dallas and Gene both agree with. From the start of Flora's run, Frank tries to control her driving and gives her bad advice, leading to her repeatedly colliding with the concrete blocks in the opening section. This leads to Andrew ordering Frank out of the car, after which Flora is able to complete the rest of the section without incident. He returns for the next two sections however and immediately starts ordering her around and even grabbing the steering wheel, resulting in her delivering the worst performance of the day in the reverse section and, like Kevin, going far too slow in the slalom and yet still hitting the foam people. Despite this, the experts feel that she may be able to do much better without Frank's presence, something Andrew already knew, hence the reason he ordered Frank out of the car to begin with. Klyne doesn't even make a serious effort in the challenge, intentionally scraping the Mustang in the opening section, which results in the challenge being halted after the initial U-turn. Diane does better than most of the previous drivers and gets through the opening section with little difficulty, but still hits several wheel rims and foam people in the remaining two sections. Finally, Robert has what turns out to be the best run of the day, getting through the U-turn perfectly and then not knocking over a single wheel rim in the reverse section. However, his main problem of being too afraid to speed is highlighted by the slalom, where he only drives at 35 km/h and still hits most of the foam people.
After the challenge, the drivers had their initial meeting with the experts. Robert is reminded that driving too slowly is an offense (he admits actually being fined for doing so at least once) and the experts quickly identify the need to address his high-speed nervousness. Stress is also felt to be the biggest issue for Margherita, Dallas, Diane and Azim. Flora admits that Frank isn't her only problem and that she still needs to drastically improve her skills. The experts all condemn Klyne for his reckless attitude, both in the episode and toward the ten accidents he caused prior to the show. Kevin admits from the very start that he may be Canada's Worst Driver. As usual, no one graduates this episode, as it serves merely as a skills evaluation.

Episode 2: Look Out!
Original airdate: November 5, 2012
 Head-to-Head Reversing: In a new challenge for this show, pairs of drivers are required to reverse down a short course, turn around in reverse and then reverse back to the start. As an added difficulty, this challenge is performed in right-hand drive Toyota Celsiors. Kevin and Margherita are the first pair to take the challenge and their run rapidly descends into chaos, with both drivers crossing into each other's lanes and demolishing large sections of the course. Margherita at least manages to finish the course, but has clearly failed the challenge, not least because she never once looked out of the back window; Kevin doesn't even get that far and gives up after getting his car wedged on a piece of styrofoam. Klyne and Robert are the second pair; Klyne completes the course with no major issues, but Robert only uses his wing mirrors to guide him and gets stuck on a set of rims, after which he gives up. Flora and Azim are next and Flora has an initially good run but, like Robert, gets her car wedged on a rim at the halfway point and becomes stuck. Azim also does well for the first half of the course, but becomes flustered and gives up after being unable to effectively make a reverse turn at the bottom of the track. Diane and Dallas are the final pair and Diane's run is good for the most part, but she goes too fast near the end and takes out a significant number of styrofoam obstacles. Dallas is another driver who insists on only using her wing mirrors and while she does eventually complete the course, she demolishes a significant portion of it.
 The Trough: In one of the show's classic challenges, the drivers are asked to drive a Suzuki Sidekick through a concrete trough, in a test of their ability to tell where their wheels are. If the drivers fall off the trough at any point, they are required to start over. In a new addition to the challenge, a "wooden bridge" was incorporated into the course (technically a section of corduroy road made with railway ties), giving drivers a chance to realign their wheels between sections. Azim is the first to attempt the challenge and nearly passes it at the first time of asking, only to fall off on the final turn; this leads to his stress problems kicking in and he never gets past the bridge on his subsequent runs. Diane fares better and, despite difficulties on the final turn, completes the course on one go. Robert shows signs of improvement after some horrible initial runs, but runs out of time before he can finish the challenge. Flora initially seems to do well, but after Andrew spots that Frank is micromanaging her steering, he reprimands Frank and makes Flora start over. She does relatively well on her subsequent runs, but falls just short of finishing each time. Klyne keeps falling off due to making turns that are too tight, which results in Maureen giving him lengthy coaching during the run; he eventually completes it, but is deemed to have failed due to Maureen making all the decisions. Margherita performs dismally, never even making it past the first turn. Dallas gets overwhelmed after falling off halfway through her initial run and gives up. Kevin is the last to take the challenge and, like Margherita, never even gets past the first turn.
 Mustang Challenge: Shoulder Check Challenge: This challenge, in which drivers must accelerate to 70 km/h and then correctly perform a shoulder check to determine on which side of an obstacle it is safe to turn in order to avoid it, has a new twist in that the drivers have two runs and will always be told to stop before the obstacle on the first run, thus also making this a test of their braking and speed control. Dallas drives too fast in her first run and her hair gets in the way of her eyes, resulting in her taking the right turn rather than stopping. After resetting (and putting in a hair clip) for her second run, she passes without difficulty. Diane has a similarly poor initial run, speeding and turning the wheel as she turns her head; on her second run, she correctly identifies the lane she needs to go into, but turns too early and takes out some of the lane markers, though is felt to have understood the lesson, despite failing it. Klyne correctly identifies that he's meant to stop on his first run, but drives far too fast and hits the central obstacle before he can stop. Keeping his speed under control, he passes with no trouble on the second run. Azim drives too fast and with only one hand on the wheel in his first run, meaning he can't stop or fully avoid the central obstacle; on his second run, he repeats the same mistake and even turns into the wrong lane, clearly failing the challenge. Due to a misunderstanding of the rules, Flora takes the right-hand exit on her first run instead of stopping, but passes the challenge without any trouble on the second run. Margherita drives at over 90 km/h in her initial run and doesn't even have time to check both shoulders before plowing into the lane markers, only narrowly avoiding the obstacle. On her second run, she speeds again, turns into the wrong lane and smashes the passenger side wing mirror when she clips the central obstacle. Since Kevin has an inherent disadvantage with only one eye, Andrew tells him ahead of time that he will be required to stop on his first run, only for Kevin to brake too late and hit the obstacle. On his second run, Kevin attempts to cheat by only checking over his left shoulder and reasoning that due to the red signal on that side he must be required to turn to his right; while he does this successfully, he fails for not understanding the challenge. Robert is the last to take the challenge, after Andrew gives him a lesson in driving at high speeds, and ends up driving too fast and demolishing the central obstacle on his first run. His second run goes more successfully and he completes the challenge.
While there are three obvious candidates to be the season's first graduate (Klyne-- who passed all the challenges-- and Flora and Robert, who generally did well, despite only passing one challenge each), Robert is the only driver who actually wants to graduate. Cam and Shyamala both vote that Robert should graduate, as they feel that his major issue of being too slow and lacking in confidence has been addressed and are unconvinced that Klyne's attitude has sufficiently improved. Andrew and Philippe want Klyne to graduate for doing better in the challenges, leaving Tim with the deciding vote (his first as an expert), which he casts in favour of Robert, who becomes the season's first graduate.

Episode 3: Look Where You Want To Go
Original airdate: November 12, 2012
Distracted Driving: This year's take on the annual challenge has two parts. In the first, Kim Lee, an employee of show sponsor Kal Tire, is brought in to test the drivers' knowledge of road signs. In the second, each of the drivers is given a task to do (such as putting on make-up, drinking a soda or speaking into a phone) while driving a Ford Crown Victoria (modified to look like a taxi) around a figure-eight course. There are no passes or fails in this challenge, as its sole purpose is to demonstrate that a driver should never, ever do anything to distract them at the wheel. This is demonstrated when Margherita causes so much damage to the car's radiator that it temporarily stops running, forcing the show's mechanics to conduct makeshift repairs using water and a raw egg. Kevin, who uses a CB radio despite being a novice driver (and therefore, not being allowed to have one), causes a similar amount of damage; he constantly pays more attention to his two-way radio link with Andrew than his driving, which causes frequent crashing into the Styrofoam blocks marking the course. In fact, even without distractions, Kevin demolishes the entire course, leading Andrew to question his ability while driving normally.
Mustang Challenge: Eye of the Needle: Another returning challenge, in which drivers must thread their vehicle through five archways at 70 km/h. Klyne is the first to take the challenge and despite being warned by both Andrew and Maureen not to speed, quickly accelerates to 100 km/h, hits the first arch and goes off-course, leading Andrew to admonish him on his reckless attitude. Azim is second and hits the first three arches on the passenger side, though manages to drive through the final two arches safely. Margherita takes the first two arches safely, but like Klyne, she speeds up to 100 km/h and goes off the course before the third arch. After a brief stress counseling session from Shyamala, Dallas performs near flawlessly, going slightly slower than requested at 65 km/h, but this is still good enough to be considered a pass. Due to her anxiety over driving at high speeds, Diane is allowed to take the course at 50 km/h, though she still hits the first two arches on the passenger side. Flora is next and her run leads to what Andrew describes as possibly the scariest incident ever witnessed on the show, as she accelerates to 140 km/h and spins off the course, destroying the car's rear bumper in the process. The experts react with horror and Andrew explains that this could have been a lethal accident. Kevin is the final driver to take this challenge and while his run at least turns out to be better than he or Andrew expected, he still lightly clips four of the five arches and smashes into the fifth.
Best Performer: Dallas, who did go 65 km/h instead of 70, but did have the only pass challenge.
Worst Performer: Flora, who pinned the gas pedal to floor, then went 140 km/h, spun off the course and ripped off the rear bumper, nearly flipping over, which then causes Andrew to explain it was the most scariest incident ever on this show and that could've been a lethal accident. Of the drivers who did manage to stay on the road, Kevin did the worst, hitting four out of the five arches.
The Figure-Eight Challenge: For the final challenge of this episode, drivers must reverse a school bus (technically a "skoolie") through a figure-eight course without hitting anything, with usage of the side mirrors being paramount. Klyne, who is first, proceeds recklessly through the challenge, causing substantial damage to the course and not even seeming to attempt to take the challenge seriously. While Andrew is furious with Klyne, he's far more angry with Maureen, who continued to cheer him on and claimed him to be a good driver even in the face of the damage he was causing. Prior to attempting the challenge, Kevin reveals to Andrew that he usually doesn't bother checking his wing mirrors, something which quickly becomes obvious as he relies on the conflicting directions of the other candidates and causes a similarly large amount of damage to the course. Margherita at least takes the challenge seriously and tries to use her mirrors, but fares little better than the two previous drivers. Things start looking up with Azim, who takes some time to get around the course, but causes nearly no damage. Diane suffers more anxiety problems and has to be coached by Andrew in the early sections, but she eventually completes the course without much trouble. Flora has trouble comprehending how to use her mirrors and duly fails the challenge. Finally, Dallas completes the challenge with few difficulties and shows none of the stress related problems she has been suffering with until now. 
Best Performer: Dallas, Azim and Diane, who did the challenge perfectly.                                                          
Worst Performer: Kevin and Klyne, who both did just as bad as each other, but Kevin did more damage to the course than Klyne.
Dallas is the only driver who shows any desire to graduate. Despite this, the experts unanimously decide that Diane should be the person who graduates, feeling that she has a better overall attitude than Dallas and would be safer to send back out onto the road, but Andrew disagrees, pointing out that Dallas had been the best performing driver until this point and that she actually wanted to leave, while Diane expressly said that she wanted to stay. Furthermore, Dallas overcame her stress-related problems, while Andrew argues that the panel should not overlook Diane's failure in the Eye of the Needle challenge at reduced speed. Ultimately, Andrew convinces the experts that Dallas should become the second graduate.

Episode 4: Making a Splash
Original airdate: November 19, 2012
Trailer Driving: In this year's take on the challenge, the candidates reverse a Dodge Ram Campervan with an attached hot dog cart through a short course. Klyne takes the challenge first and succeeds in completing it almost as quickly as Andrew did in his demonstration. Azim's stress problems prove to be his undoing once again and he gives up after repeatedly jackknifing at the halfway point. Margherita nearly gives up as well, but eventually succeeds in completing the course, though she takes 37 minutes, more than 12 times longer than it took either Andrew or Klyne. Flora initially does well on the challenge, but Frank begins micromanaging her again and she eventually gives up after several unsuccessful attempts. While Diane wants Stephane to coach her around the course, he insists that she do it herself, which leads to her walking the course by foot several times to get a grasp on it. She succeeds, but takes the longest time yet at 55 minutes. Kevin takes so long on the challenge that the sun begins setting, forcing the crew to use the headlights of other vehicles to mark out the course; despite all this, he still can't complete the course and has to give up when the sun completely sets, making it too dark to continue.
The Water Tank Challenge: The candidates must drive a modified PT Cruiser with a roof-mounted water tank smoothly through a course to avoid getting wet. Despite resolving to not get wet at all, Andrew is splashed for the fifth straight season after taking a slalom turn too wide. Margherita is the first candidate to take the challenge and ends up spilling much of her water on at the end of the initial straight by braking too late. Cheryl gets splashed the most during their run, causing her to accuse Margherita of doing it on purpose; she loses  during the challenge, most of which was lost at the start and at the end when she backed into a concrete barrier. Kevin is the third driver in a row to brake too late at the start, with predictable results. Though the exact amount of water that he lost was not revealed, Andrew specified that his run was easily the worst in rehab, losing more water than anyone else and causing the most damage to the course. Klyne lapses into his speeding habits again, leading to Maureen getting heavily soaked, though the rest of his run is relatively smooth and he loses just . Azim has a less than smooth run, braking too sharply at the beginning and repeatedly going off-course in the reversing section, resulting in him losing . Flora's erratic acceleration results in her losing a lot of water on the opening straight and to add insult to injury, she has to retake it because she didn't drive at the required 50 km/h. She ultimately lost , though the experts noted that she was finally starting to fight back against Frank's attempts to micromanage her.
Best Performer: Klyne, who did hit some obstacles but did the best with losing .
Worst Performer: Kevin, but although his exact water loss wasn't shown, he did carelessly hit the most out of the whole group and did lose the most water, according to Andrew. Flora did lose the most water in the entire group, but wasn't specifically as bad as Kevin.
Mustang Challenge: Swerve and Avoid: For this year's take on a challenge that has previously been credited with saving viewers' lives, the drivers must drive toward a cityscape at 70 km/h and avoid a styrofoam dog walker by swerving promptly and not hitting the brakes. Each driver has two runs to complete the challenge. Klyne gets an extra lesson and is told to take a practice run at 90 km/h, which proves to be too fast to complete the course. Despite this, he goes at 90 km/h in his first run and hits the cityscape. After yet another reprimand from Andrew, on his second run, Klyne goes at the required speed and passes without any trouble. Margherita is next and despite extensive coaching from Cheryl during her first run, she clips the cityscape on the passenger side. Her second run is more successful and for the first time this season, Margherita passes a challenge. Before her run, Flora warns Frank to keep his mouth shut; he obliges and she performs flawlessly, passing at the first time of asking. Diane brakes on her first run, leading to her hitting the cityscape; her second run proves to be the worst one yet, as she drives far too fast and ends up crashing into the cityscape head-on. Taking things calmly for once, Azim succeeds at the first go, surprising even himself. Kevin demonstrates a case of target fixation in his first run, steering directly at the obstacle he was supposed to avoid and hitting it head-on and does little better in his second run, hitting the cityscape on his passenger side.
Prior to the judges' deliberations, Maureen joins Klyne and the two reflect on their respective attitudes and the role they played in Klyne's destructive habits. It quickly becomes obvious to the judges that Klyne is the only possible graduate and while Shyamala argues that no one should graduate this episode and that Klyne should be made to stay at least one more episode to make sure his attitude change sticks, the others conclude that there is nothing more they can teach him and that his future as a driver is entirely in his own hands now, as Klyne becomes the third graduate.

Episode 5: Ice Cream
Original airdate: November 26, 2012
The episode begins with Andrew receiving a letter from Halifax speech coach Robert Spears criticizing Andrew over his pronunciation of "kilometre."
Ice Cream Truck Parallel Park:
Canada's Worst Gas Station:
Mustang Challenge: Reverse Flick

As usual, no one graduates this episode.

Episode 6: Hole in One
Original airdate: December 3, 2012
Changing a Tire: The rehab centre invited local mechanic Kim Lee of Kal Tire back to show the drivers how to change a tire. They then were asked to change a tire while it was "raining" with a sprinkler. Azim finished in 18 minutes, but Diane finished one minute faster. Margherita couldn't get the spare tire on and quit, while Kevin completed in 16 minutes, the fastest of the group. Flora, however, didn't take the challenge, preferring instead to call CAA if she ever got a flat.
The Teeter-Totter: In this returning challenge (which Andrew notes is being run later in the season than previously due to the drivers' habit of destroying the clutches on the test cars), the drivers are put at the wheel of a manual transmission car, which they are asked to balance on a teeter-totter. Flora takes the challenge first and, in what is rapidly becoming a familiar pattern, fails after running out of time due to Frank's constant criticism and attempts to micromanage her driving; she also caused one of her car's tires to burst during the challenge, though this was not counted toward the half-hour she was given. Prior to Margherita's run, Andrew presents her with a new pair of flat-soled sports shoes which he has purchased for her to drive with instead of her wedged heels. Despite this, she has what proves to be the worst run of the five, using far too much gas and never getting close to balancing the teeter-totter. Cheryl badgers her into swapping back to her wedge shoes, but this just makes matters worse and Margherita eventually ends up destroying the car's clutch. Diane is third and manages a near-flawless performance, balancing the teeter-totter even faster than Andrew did in his demonstration. Azim takes somewhat longer, but eventually passes the challenge. Kevin has the final run and makes numerous mistakes in doing so; not only does he repeatedly hit the gas too hard, he tries to change gears without using the clutch and stalls numerous times. He ultimately fails after running out of time, the only saving grace being that he didn't burn out the clutch like Margherita.
Best Performer: Diane, who was able to do it with the fastest amount of time on her first try.
Worst Performer: Margherita, who burnt out the clutch. Kevin also did poorly, stalling the car almost 40 times.
Mustang Challenge: Mini Golf: This new challenge gives the drivers nine runs at driving an oversized golf ball through a similarly oversized windmill tunnel. Diane is first up and Stephane's well-intentioned, but ultimately bad, advice causes her to miss her first five shots, before hitting two (and then missing the final two). She blames Stephane for her underwhelming performance, which Andrew concurs with. Azim is next and takes a scientific approach by balancing the ball on the left-hand side of the front bumper in order to compensate for the strong wind; he scores four times. Kevin tries to use short bursts of acceleration and strong hits to guide the ball to its target; however, this proves to be a less than successful approach and he only scores once. Margherita (this time in her sports shoes throughout the challenge) fails her first five attempts due to a lack of understanding over where the bumper is, but she improves as the challenge progresses and scores on her final four goes, posting the joint-best score. Finally, Flora takes her first attempt at an incredibly slow pace and barely even gets a third of the way down the course before the footage ends; Andrew then informs the viewer that her run eventually had to be abandoned due to her running out of time and that she didn't score on any of the attempts that she did make.
Forward Handbrake J-Turn: In another of the show's traditional challenges, the drivers are each required to make a handbrake turn in a Mini Cooper and swerve around a foam person featuring the driver's own face inside a confined space; each driver has five attempts. Kevin is first up and, in a change of form, nearly gets it on his first attempt, failing mostly because he took the run at 70 km/h instead of the requested 40 km/h; he reduces his speed for his second run and, for only the second time this season, passes a challenge. Flora's woeful run of challenges continues, as she goes too slow in her first run, clips the entry obstacles in the second, drives directly into the foam Flora on the third, uses the footbrake instead of the handbrake on the fourth, before plowing through the foam Flora again and this time ending up in the adjoining field in her final run; this leads Andrew to describe Flora's performance as the worst he's ever seen for this particular challenge. Azim, who is now finally showing confidence and self-belief, predicts he will pass this challenge on the first go and actually succeeds in doing so. Before Margherita's run, Andrew shows Margherita a series of articles listing accidents and fatalities that have been caused by drivers wearing high heels and wedges, but Cheryl loudly insists that his concerns are untrue and that it's perfectly safe to wear heels, leading to her badmouthing Andrew and the experts after she and Margherita get in the car, obliviously unaware that the experts are listening to every word she says. Margherita ultimately fails the challenge after repeatedly using the footbrake instead of the handbrake and while Cheryl attempts to blame Andrew for upsetting her prior to the challenge, Margherita herself accepts full responsibility and admits to not focusing well enough. Despite being predicted for success by Andrew, Diane fares surprisingly poorly, attempting the manoeuvre too late on her first run, going too slowly on her next three runs and then hitting the foam Diane on her final run.
Best Performer: Azim, as he passed on his first attempt with no problem. 
Worst Performer: Flora, as she plowed through the foam person (twice) and through the side wall, which Andrew deemed as the worst run that he ever seen on the challenge, even worse than Canada's Worst Driver 5 "winner" Angelina Marcantognini, if that's even possible, considering Angelina destroyed the course so badly, the camera got flipped upside-down.
Prior to the experts' deliberations, Cam informs Margherita that wearing wedges or any other form of cumbersome footwear is considered a criminal offense if it is judged to have been responsible for an automotive accident. While Andrew encourages Diane to put herself forward for graduation, she admits that she does not deserve to graduate based on her performance in this episode and Flora also does not want to graduate. Azim, on the other hand, feels that he finally has the confidence and skills to graduate. Kevin, meanwhile, is informed that certain drivers (referring to Canada's Worst Driver 3 "winner" Jason Zhang and Canada's Worst Driver 5 "runner-up" Mike Butt) have given up driving in the wake of their respective appearances on the show; Kevin's response is to call the drivers in question "stupid" and vow never to give up driving even if he's named Canada's Worst Driver, a response which enrages the panel. With Azim the best performer in the episode and the only driver showing any desire to leave, his graduation is a foregone conclusion. However, the experts also discuss the possibility of forcing Margherita to pick a new nominator and kicking Cheryl out of rehab for her disrespectful behavior after the previous challenge, in what would have been a first for the series. Luckily for Margherita, Cheryl is ultimately allowed to stay (as Andrew states, "Kicking Cheryl out wouldn't do Margherita any good"), though is given a warning over her attitude and, as expected, Azim becomes the next graduate.

Episode 7: 1-2-3-Go!
Original airdate: December 10, 2012
Three-Point Turning: A small turning space is set up using a variety of cars and the drivers are each given 30 minutes in which to pull off a three-point turn using a Jeep Wrangler. Kevin (the only male nominee remaining after Azim graduated last episode) takes the challenge first and soon finds it tough going due to his lack of understanding of the technique, repeatedly crashing into things and taking far more steps than allowed. He ultimately runs out of time, never managing better than a five-point turn. Flora is next and, in a change of form, actually solicits Frank's advice to complete the challenge. Even with his help, however, she fails to complete the challenge; like Kevin, the shortest she manages is a five-point turn. Diane takes her first run without any real thought as to how she's going to accomplish the challenge and duly gets stuck. During the second run, Stephane works out a way of completing the challenge that even the producers had not thought possible and with his help, Diane is able to pass the challenge, getting much credit from Andrew for pulling off a very tricky series of turns. Margherita is in an extremely foul mood during the challenge (exactly why isn't stated, though Margherita mentions that she's having personal problems) and, thus, never really makes an effort in the challenge, repeatedly running into cars and snapping at Cheryl who, for once, is the more subdued of the two (considering she damn near made history as the first nominator to be expelled from rehab for snapping at Andrew during the Forward Handbrake J-Turn in the previous episode). She duly fails the challenge, with Andrew advising her to talk to Shyamala, a notion she had refused until now.
Best Performer: Diane, who had the only pass despite Stephane coaching her.
Worst Performer: Technically, all the drivers (besides Diane) were as bad as each other, but Margherita somehow did worse by letting her emotions work her up and hit a car on nearly every attempt.
The Longest Reversing Challenge Ever: As the name suggests, this is the longest reversing challenge that has ever been featured on the show, with the drivers having to back up a BMW 540i (previously used as Margherita's car in the Gas Station challenge in Episode 5) for a full kilometre through a straight-line course made up of three sections; one lined with stacked wheel rims, one with cars and one with plywood boxes and foam blocks. Diane takes the challenge first and despite knocking over nine wheel rims during a shaky start, she quickly picks up the challenge and doesn't hit anything during the remainder of the course. Kevin follows and fares much worse, spending nearly the whole challenge looking out the front windshield despite Lenny repeatedly reminding him that he should be looking out the back and hits 23 objects. Once again, Margherita fails to make a serious effort due to her bad mood and plows through the course with little regard as to where she's going or what she's hitting. She ultimately hits 37 objects before Andrew calls a halt to the challenge and tells her that unless she speaks to Shyamala, she will not be allowed to take any further challenges. Flora takes the last run and immediately applies full gas without even touching the steering wheel, promptly hitting every single rim in the opening stretch before eventually getting wedged, forcing Andrew and Frank to clear out the rims from underneath the car. Flora restarts her run, only to get stuck again almost immediately, leading to the crew having to get her unstuck. While she ultimately hits fewer objects than Margherita with 29, Andrew judges Flora's run to be the worst based on her extreme carelessness.
Best Performer: Diane, who also had the only pass.
Worst Performer: Even though Margherita hit more things than anyone else in the group, Flora was deemed the worst, due to her careless attitude and never making an effort to go cleanly through the course.
Mustang Challenge: Icy Corner: In one of the show's traditional challenges, the drivers are each tasked with approaching an icy corner at 40 km/h and applying and releasing their brakes in time to take the corner without skidding. Each driver will have five attempts. Kevin drives at nearly double the requested speed on his first run and crashes through the wall. On his second run, he spends so much time checking his speed that he doesn't look where he's going and doesn't even brake before hitting the wall. In his remaining three runs, Kevin goes too slowly each time and continues to demonstrate his problems with target fixation, never once looking where he wants to go. Diane nearly gets the challenge right on the first go, but Stephane unwittingly distracts her on her first run by constantly reading her speedometer out loud, causing her to execute the manoeuvre too late and clip the wall. He keeps quiet on her second run and she passes with ease. Margherita, fresh from a session with Shyamala in which she learned valuable techniques for dealing with stress, does even better and passes at the first time of asking. Flora goes too fast in her first run and stares at the wall, which she duly crashes through. She actually gets the manoeuvre right on her second go, but speeds again and clips the wall. She continues to speed on her next two runs and, this time, doesn't even look where she wants to go, once again crashing through the wall. On her last run, she finally gets the speed right, but stares straight at the wall and never releases the brake, which leads to her destroying most of the course.
Best Performer: Margherita, who passed on her first try. 
Worst Performer: Kevin, who went nearly double the speed, never looked where he wanted to go and released the break. Flora also did poorly, but did go less faster than Kevin.
When meeting with the experts, Kevin asks to be considered for graduation out of a desire to avoid being in the final, but is immediately shot down and told that there's no way he will graduate this episode, mainly due to his comments in the previous meeting. Flora is more realistic about her chances and admits she may be Canada's Worst Driver. Margherita feels that she's ready to graduate, while Diane is unsure. With Kevin and Flora obviously unfit to graduate, the decision comes down to Diane and Margherita and Diane's lack of enthusiasm over graduating combined with a feeling that Margherita is more technically skilled leads to Tim, Philippe and Shyamala voting for her to graduate. Andrew and Cam are adamant that, despite her lack of enthusiasm, Diane is a much better driver overall and that Margherita is not ready to graduate, but are unable to convince the others to change their minds, leading to Margherita being the penultimate graduate, once again ensuring that there will not be three women in the finale and sending Diane into the finale with Kevin and Flora, much to the dismay of Andrew, who tells Margherita to her face that he totally disagrees with Tim's, Shyamala's and Phillipe's decision and that Diane should be the one leaving rehab instead of her, yet nonetheless congratulates her on having improved so much, as she had been one of the worst drivers in rehab during the first few episodes (and especially the worst during the Three-Point Turn).

Episode 8: Trophy Please...
Original airdate: December 17, 2012
The Forward and Reverse Slalom: For this challenge, the drivers are placed at the wheel of the Ford Crown Victoria "taxicab" previously used in the Distracted Driving challenge (with the other two candidates as their passengers) and given the task of driving forwards and then in reverse through slalom course containing six foam people. Each driver will have ten attempts to complete the course in less than 50 seconds. Kevin is first and on his first run, he drives too fast and holds the steering wheel awkwardly, resulting in him hitting a foam person. After being advised by Andrew to go slower and correct his grip, Kevin quickly masters the forward section, but soon runs into massive difficulties on the reverse section, constantly hitting the obstacles and destroying the car's front bumper. While Andrew concedes that Kevin's glass eye is a major impediment, he also notes that Kevin could try turning his head more, using his mirrors or asking Flora or Diane for help, none of which he does. Before his last run, Lenny gives Kevin some encouragement, but Kevin approaches the run with a defeatist attitude and, this time, can't even complete the forward part. Diane immediately aces the forward section, but ends up clipping a foam person on her first shot at the reverse section, in no small part due to Kevin (who is sat next to her) constantly fidgeting. After getting him to swap with Flora (which also gives the car a better weight distribution), she passes with ease on her second attempt. Flora is the last driver to take the course and her performance proves to be the worst; like Kevin, she takes two goes to get the forward section right, before a series of ultimately disastrous attempts on the reverse section which see her repeatedly go off the tarmac altogether. She comes close to passing on her ninth run, but ends up crashing into the blocks which make up the starting section. After she goes off the track yet again on her final attempt, Andrew comments that if this challenge alone decided the title of Canada's Worst Driver, Flora would be awarded the trophy.
Best Performer: Diane, who had the only pass on this challenge with her second attempt.
Worst Performer: Even though Kevin and Flora both fail, Flora is deemed the worst for never coming close to passing and hit either an obstacle or went off the road.
Mustang Challenge: The Mega-Challenge: This year's Mega-Challenge is a full kilometre in length and, as in most previous years, consists of elements from many of this year's challenges. It begins with the drivers having to go through five Eye of the Needle arches, then having to swerve and avoid a foam pedestrian, before having to drive forwards and then backwards through a lengthy course of wheel rims. The drivers then have to do a reverse flick and then end the run with a handbrake J-turn. Flora gets the first run and hits every single arch in the Eye of the Needle section before mowing down the foam pedestrian. She then has a bad run through the wheel rim track in both directions, takes her reverse flick much too early and crashes through the outer wall of that part of the course and then fails to turn at all in the final J-turn, crashing through both the foam Flora that serves as an obstacle and the outer wall, finishing with 24 hits. Diane goes next and drives far too quickly to begin with, hitting most of the arches on the opening run, though she at least avoids the foam pedestrian. After a comparatively decent run through the wheel rim segment, she then takes her reverse spin-out, but executes it a little too late and clips the far wall. On the final J-turn segment, Diane clips the foam Diane, skids and then goes even further off the course than Flora did. Diane is tearful after this run and proclaims herself Canada's Worst Driver; Andrew admits that he thought she'd do better, but, despite finishing with 23 hits, still considers her far from the worst. Kevin also drives far too fast on the first straight; he somehow avoids hitting the first three arches, but completely smashes the last two. This is followed by an abysmal run through the wheel rim section, in which he manages to wedge himself on the rims during the reverse part, requiring Andrew to step in and free the car. On the reverse spin-out, Kevin takes too long to start turning the wheel and doesn't turn it far enough when he does, crashing off-course. When doing the final J-turn, Kevin completely forgets how to do the manoeuvre and hits the footbrake instead of applying the handbrake, losing control and going off the course yet again. Despite all the drivers doing poorly, Kevin's run is judged to be the worst by Andrew, as he hit more obstacles than Diane and Flora combined, with a staggering 73. After his Mega Challenge, Andrew notes Kevin's Mega Challenge as the worst-ever Mega Challenge run (surpassing both Shelby D'Souza from the third season and Canada's Worst Driver 5 "winner" Angelina Marcantognini, if that's even possible, as Shelby hit 86 obstacles, while Angelina caused the Corvette to overheat partway through the precision reverse and destroyed the whole reverse portion while out of control in the forward handbrake J-Turn during their respective runs).
Best Performer: Diane, although she only fully passed one portion of the Mega Challenge with 23 hits. Flora only hits 24, but then prompts Andrew to say she might be Canada's Worst Driver.
Worst Performer: Kevin, who carelessly hits over 70 obstacles, prompting Andrew to say Kevin might be Canada's Worst Driver.
Road Test: For the second season in a row, drivers must navigate a course involving 29 turns through Hamilton, Ontario, this time in a Ford Mustang convertible, with the beginning and ending at Gore Park, since the Ford Mustang GT is no longer road-worthy. Diane is first up and turns in a flawless performance, not making a single mistake (aside from going slightly too slow on the Chedoke Expressway) in what Andrew describes as the best Road Test performance in the show's history, maybe even surpassing Arun Suryanarayanan from the fifth season. During the run, Diane discusses the confidence she has gained from being on the show and even admits that it has improved her relationship with Stephane, a comment Cam notes is "the best compliment the rehab centre has ever gotten." After the run, Andrew tells Diane that, even without Flora or Kevin having done their runs, her status as the final graduate is all but certain and he's ultimately proven right, as Flora very quickly starts making basic mistakes, including stopping at every intersection even when the lights are on green, failing to signal, making prohibited turns, making turns from the wrong lane, driving into oncoming traffic and even driving head-on into the MacNab Bus Terminal. She then takes two attempts to get on the Chedoke Expressway, missing her first attempt after being too nervous to make it. Her actual run on the highway proves relatively uneventful, though she drives well below the speed limit. To cap things off, she even parks several feet away from the pavement at the end of the run. Kevin has the last run and for the most part, the mistakes he makes are roughly the same as Flora's, making turns from the wrong lane and cutting off other drivers in particular. Andrew also notices that Kevin tends to drift between lanes and very rarely looks in any direction other than straight ahead when driving, which only exacerbates the problem caused by the lack of vision in his right eye. Like Flora before him, Kevin's highway run also goes without major incident, but Andrew again tells him that he needs to be far more observant of the other traffic. As they return to the starting point, Andrew asks Kevin if he really thinks he should be driving and while Kevin admits that he probably shouldn't be driving, he says that he doesn't intend to give up.
Best Performer: Diane, who does not make a single moving violation during the final drive.
Worst Performer: Both Flora and Kevin were as bad as each other.
In an obvious decision, Diane becomes the final graduate, with Andrew and the panel describing her as a "model student." It's a completely different story for Kevin and Flora, though, as both are deemed completely unfit to drive by the experts, yet both are adamant that they will never give up their licenses. In the final discussion, Tim and Philippe deem Kevin to be the worst, feeling that while Kevin and Flora are equally bad overall, Flora has a very slim chance of improving someday, while Kevin's missing eye has proved to be an insurmountable problem on top of his existing issues. Cam and Shyamala, on the other hand, deem Flora to be the worse of the two, feeling that she showed a dismissive attitude toward the entire process and that, while Kevin had at least put some effort into the city drive despite his missing right eye, Flora made no real attempt to improve her driving. Andrew is left with the deciding vote, but notes on the difficulty of actually deciding who is worse-- both passed just two challenges over the course of the whole season, both have nominators who tend to exacerbate their problems (Lenny by not pushing Kevin harder and Frank by constantly interfering with Flora's driving and giving her bad advice), Flora did worse on the Slalom challenge and Kevin worse on the Mega-Challenge and both were equally bad (in slightly different ways, as Phillipe stated) on the final Road Test. This lack of a clear difference between the two leads to an unprecedented decision-- both Kevin and Flora are named Canada's Worst Driver (Kevin becomes the fourth man and Flora becomes the fifth woman), with Andrew giving each a separate part of the trophy and implying that, had either volunteered to give up their license, they would have avoided the title. As the two are driven away by Lenny and Frank, respectively, Andrew ends the season on a somber note by voicing his concern that two drivers could be so equally and so terrifyingly bad.

References

External links
 
 

08
2012 Canadian television seasons